List of Members of the 10th Lok Sabha, (20 June 1991 – 10 May 1996) elected during 1991 Indian general election held during May–June 1991. The Lok Sabha (House of the People) is the lower house in the Parliament of India, four sitting members from Rajya Sabha, the Upper House of Indian Parliament, were elected to 10th Lok Sabha after the Indian general election, 1991.

P V Narasimha Rao of Indian National Congress became the Prime Minister of India from 21 June 1991 till 16 May 1996, after INC won 244 seats, 47 more than previous 9th Lok Sabha.

The next 11th Lok Sabha was constituted on 15 May 1996, after 1996 Indian general election.

Important members
 Speaker:
Shivraj Patil from 10 July 1991 to 22 May 1996
 Deputy Speaker:
S. Mallikarjunaiah from 13 August 1991 to 10 May 1996
Secretary General:
K C Rastogi from 20 June 1991 to 31 December 1991
C K Jain from 1 January 1992 to 31 May 1994
R.C. Bhardwaj from 31 May 1994 to 31 December 1995
S.N. Mishra from 1 January 1996 to 10 May 1996

List of members by political party
Members of the political party in the 10th Lok Sabha are given below:

List of Members by state

Andhra Pradesh
Keys:

Arunachal Pradesh
Keys:

Assam
Keys:

Karnataka
Keys:

Keys:

Maharashtra
(Plain Text Format)
 Ahmednagar	GEN	Gadakh Yeshawantrao	M	INC	
 Akola	GEN	Fundkar Pandurang Pundlik	M	BJP	
 Amravati	GEN	Pratibha Devisinha Patil (W)	F	INC	
 Aurangabad	GEN	Moreshwar Save	M	SHS	
 Baramati	GEN	Ajit Annatrao Pawar	M	INC	
 Beed	GEN	Kshirsagar Kesharbai Sonajirao Alias Kaku (W)	F	INC	
 Bhandara	GEN	Praful Manohar Bhai Patel	M	INC	
 Buldhana	(SC)	Wasnik Mukul Balkrishna	M	INC	
 Chandrapur	GEN	Potdukhe Shantaram	M	INC	
 Chimur	GEN	Muttemwar Vilas Baburao	M	INC	
 Dahanu	(ST)	Damu Barku Shingda	M	INC	
 Dhule	(ST)	Chaure Bapu Hari	M	INC	
 Erandol	GEN	Patil Vijay Naval	M	INC	
 Hingoli	GEN	Gundewar Vilasrao Nagnathrao	M	SHS	
 Ichalkaranji	GEN	Mane Balaso Alias Rajaram Shankarrao	M	INC	
 Jalgaon	GEN	Gunavant Rambhau Saroda	M	BJP	
 Jalna	GEN	Ankushrao Tope	M	INC	
 Karad	GEN	Chavan Prithviraj Dajishaheb	M	INC	
 Khed	GEN	Navale Vidura Vithoba	M	INC	
 Kolaba	GEN	A.R. Antulay	M	INC	
 Kolhapur	GEN	Gaikwad Udaysingrao Nanasaheb	M	INC	
 Kopargaon	GEN	Kale Shankarrao Deoram	M	INC	
 Latur	GEN	Patil Shivraj Vishwanath	M	INC	
 Mgaon	(ST)	Kahandole Zamru Manglu	M	INC	
 Mumbai-North	GEN	Ram Naik	M	BJP	
 Mumbai-North-Central	GEN	Dighe Sharad Shankar	M	INC	
 Mumbai-North-East	GEN	Guradas Kamat	M	INC	
 Mumbai-North-West	GEN	Sunil Dutt	M	INC	
 Mumbai-South	GEN	Deora Murli	M	INC	
 Mumbai-South-Central	GEN	Mohan Rawale	M	SHS	
 Nagpur	GEN	Meghe Dattaji Raghobaji	M	INC	
 Nanded	GEN	Suryakants Patil (W)	F	INC	
 Nandurbar	(ST)	Gavit Manikrao Hodalya	M	INC	
 Nashik	GEN	Pawar Vasant Niwrutti	M	INC	
 Osmanabad	(SC)	Kamble Arvind Tulshiram	M	INC	
 Pandharpur	(SC)	Thorat Sandipan Bhagwan	M	INC	
 Parbhani	GEN	Deshmukh Ashokrao Anandrao	M	SHS	
 Pune	GEN	Anna Joshi	M	BJP	
 Rajapur	GEN	Sudhir Sawant	M	INC	
 Ramtek	GEN	Bhonsle Tejsingharao Laxmanrao	M	INC	
 Ratnagiri	GEN	Govindram Nikam	M	INC	
 Sangli	GEN	Patil Prakashbapu Vasantrao	M	INC	
 Satara	GEN	Bhosale Prataprao Baburao	M	INC	
 Solapur	GEN	Sadul Dharmanna Mondayya	M	INC	
 Thane	GEN	Kapse Ramchandra Ganesh	M	BJP	
 Wardha	GEN	Ghangare Ramchandra Marotrao	M	CPM	
 Washim	GEN	Anantrao Vitthalrao Deshmukh	M	INC	
 Yavatmal	GEN	Uttamrao Deorao Patil	M	INC

References

External links
 Lok Sabha website

 
Terms of the Lok Sabha
1991 establishments in India
1996 disestablishments in India